The 1975 Virginia Slims of Houston  was a women's tennis tournament played on indoor carpet courts at the Sam Houston Coliseum in Houston, Texas in the United States that was part of the 1975 Virginia Slims World Championship Series. It was the fifth edition of the tournament and was held from March 10 through March 15, 1975. Second-seeded Chris Evert won the singles title and earned $15,000 first-prize money.

Finals

Singles
 Chris Evert defeated  Margaret Court 6–3, 6–2
 It was Evert's 3rd singles title of the year and the 42nd of her career.

Doubles
 Françoise Dürr /  Betty Stöve defeated  Evonne Goolagong /  Virginia Wade 2–6, 6–3, 7–6(5–2)

Prize money

References

Virginia Slims of Houston
Virginia Slims of Houston
Virginia Slims of Houstonl
Virginia Slims of Houston
Virginia Slims of Houston
Virginia Slims of Houston